Brandon may refer to:

Names and people
Brandon (given name), a male  given name 
Brandon (surname), a surname with several different origins

Places

Australia
Brandon, a farm and 19th century homestead in Seaham, New South Wales
Brandon, Queensland, a small town just south of Townsville

Canada
Brandon, Manitoba

England
Brandon, County Durham
Brandon, Lincolnshire
Brandon, Northumberland
Brandon, Suffolk
Brandon, Warwickshire
Brandon Hill, Bristol

France
Brandon, Saône-et-Loire

Ireland
Brandon, County Kerry
Mount Brandon, a mountain overlooking the village
Brandon Bay, the bay overlooked by the village
Brandon Creek, County Kerry
Brandon Hill, a hill between Graiguenamana and Inistoige, Co. Kilkenny.

United States
Brandon Corner, California
Brandon, Colorado
Brandon, Florida
Brandon, Iowa
Brandon Township, Michigan
Brandon, Minnesota
Brandon Township, Minnesota
Brandon, Mississippi
Brandon, Montana
Brandon, Nebraska
Brandon, New York
Brandon, Ohio
Brandon, South Dakota
Brandon, Texas
Brandon, Vermont
Brandon (CDP), Vermont
Brandon, Wisconsin
Brandon Lake, a lake in Minnesota
Lower Brandon Plantation (Prince George County, Virginia)
Upper Brandon Plantation (Prince George County, Virginia)
Brandon Plantation (Halifax County, Virginia)

Other 

 Brandon, the name of the dog in the American television series Punky Brewster
 Ulmus americana 'Brandon', an elm cultivar
 Brandon Railroad, Nebraska, United States
 , several warships
 Brandon, a male doll in the Groovy Girls doll line

See also

Brendon (disambiguation)
Brandin, a given name and surname